Brian Estridge, commonly known by his middle name, is the play-by-play broadcaster for the TCU Horned Frogs IMG College football and men's basketball broadcasts. Additionally, he calls select college basketball and baseball games for Fox Sports Net and Stadium's Mountain West Network, and he is the President of the broadcast company RedVoice Productions, LLC. From 2009 until July 2022, he also co-hosted WBAP's morning show along with Hal Jay.

Biography

Brian Estridge was born and raised in Kershaw, South Carolina. At the age of 14 Estridge walked in and auditioned for a newspaper radio ad. After a cold reading he was hired for the job. At the same time they hired him to call local high school sports, allowing him to call the 2A South Carolina state girls basketball championship game that year.

After graduating high school Estridge attended Appalachian State University where he majored in political science. After graduating college Estridge was hired by Appalachian State to call football and men's basketball. A few years later he was hired to be the voice of the Miami RedHawks. In 1998 TCU's athletic director Eric Hyman contacted Estridge and hired him to be the voice of the Horned Frogs. While acting as the voice of TCU, Estridge has won multiple Texas Sports broadcaster of the year awards.

In 2001 ESPN Radio began a Dallas affiliate. Estridge was hired to host the mid-day show with Newy Scruggs while maintaining his duties with TCU. Estridge was later moved to the mid-afternoon slot where he would host with Randy Galloway. Estridge remained with Galloway until he was hired by WBAP to co-host their morning show in 2009. Since joining the morning show, Estridge has been credited with saving a life due to a discussion Hal Jay and he had on the symptoms of heart attacks.

Estridge resides in Colleyville, Texas with his wife Becky and has two children.

RedVoice, LLC

Estridge began RedVoice Productions, LLC in 2006 and acts as President of the company. The company is headquartered at 7209 Windswept Tri in Colleyville, TX.

In 2013 Estridge's ties with ESPN Radio allowed him to apply for the rights to broadcast the Heart of Dallas Bowl. The company was granted the broadcast rights and allowed to begin broadcasting the game in January 2014. RedVoice continues to maintain these rights. In 2015 they acquired the rights to the Celebration Bowl, the Armed Forces Bowl, and the Bahamas Bowl.

First Team Radio

In 2017 RedVoice teamed up with Pikewood Sports and broadcast their college bowl games under the name Gameday Radio. They also doubled their bowl production by adding the Famous Idaho Potato Bowl, the Frisco Bowl, the Gasparilla Bowl, and the Birmingham Bowl. Estridge himself acts as the play-by-play voice for the DFW Bowls when there aren't TCU conflicts. All games produced by RedVoice, LLC air across Premiere Radio Networks affiliates.

Inventory continued to increase in 2018 as RedVoice acquired the Las Vegas Bowl and expanded into college basketball by acquiring broadcast rights for the Myrtle Beach Invitational (semi's & championship), the Charleston Classic (championship), the NIT Tip-Off (all Brooklyn games), the AdvoCare Invitational (championship), the Wooden Legacy (championship), and the Diamond Head Classic (championship). As in 2017, all 2018 events were broadcast under the name Gameday Radio.

For 2019 the group name was changed to Bowlday Radio. Overall they kept their current broadcasts and added the Cure Bowl to their inventory. 

In addition to Estridge, on-air talent includes TCU football sideline reporter Landry Burdine, Kansas football and men's basketball play-by-play radio broadcaster Brian Hanni, Kansas State broadcaster Wyatt Thompson, Dave Hunziker, Andy Demetra, Georgia Tech broadcaster Randy McDaniel, Chris Mycoskie, Hans Olsen, and former college football coach Rob Best. The number of personnel is expected to continue to increase as RedVoice continues to acquire more bowl games, expand into college basketball tournaments, and begin an NCAA Football Game of the Week.

Ahead of the 2020-21 college football postseason, the network's name changed to First Team Radio. After reaching a marketing agreement with Bowl Season, the network is now branded as Bowl Season Radio by First Team during the college football postseason.

References 

College football announcers
College basketball announcers in the United States
College baseball announcers in the United States
Living people
People from Kershaw, South Carolina
Year of birth missing (living people)